OSL may refer to:

Science and Technology
 Open Shading Language, a shading language
 Open Software License, an open-source software license
 Optically stimulated luminescence, a method of measuring doses from ionizing radiation, which is often used in mineral dating

Groups, organizations, companies
 Sosoliso Airlines, ICAO airline designator
 Ontario Soccer League, a semi-pro soccer league in Ontario, Canada
 Orchestra of St. Luke's, chamber orchestra in Manhattan, New York City
 Order of Saint Luke, a Methodist religious order
 Oregon Short Line Railroad, a former railroad in the U.S. states of Wyoming, Idaho, Utah, Montana and Oregon
 Oud-Strijders Legioen, a Dutch right-wing organization (1952–2010)

Events
 Ongamenet Starleague, a tournament for professional StarCraft players in South Korea
 Outside Lands, a music and arts festival that takes place annually in San Francsico's Golden Gate Park

Other uses
 Oslo Airport, Gardermoen, IATA airport code
 Osl, a Hungarian gens originating in the 12th century

See also

 
 
 

 OSI (disambiguation)